Grant Silcock (born 21 May 1975) is a former professional tennis player from Australia. Silcock is currently Anglican Church Grammar School head tennis coach.

Career
Silcock was a doubles specialist and won the Hong Kong Open in 1999, partnering James Greenhalgh. The pair upset future Grand Slam winners Mark Knowles and Daniel Nestor in the semi-finals. They won the final in a walkover, as one of their opponents, Andre Agassi, withdrew with a shoulder injury. 

His next best result on the ATP Tour was reaching the semi-finals of the Campionati Internazionali di Sicilia in 2001, with Jordan Kerr. 

He made the second round of a Grand Slam on five occasions, once with Paul Kilderry as his partner, once with Dejan Petrovic and three times with Kerr. It was the furthest he would reach in a Grand Slam tournament, although he came close to a third round appearance in the 2002 French Open when he and Kerr lost a second set tiebreak which would have given them a win over Knowles/Nestor.

The Australian made the occasional singles appearances on the Challenger and Futures circuit and reached a ranking of 536 in the world.

ATP career finals

Doubles: 1 (1–0)

Challenger titles

Doubles: (9)

References

1975 births
Living people
Australian male tennis players
Place of birth missing (living people)